Coolroom is a UK digital download store offering films and music to own and rent.  It is accessible online and as a bespoke IPTV channel on Microsoft's Windows Media Center available on laptops, desktops and home entertainment PCs.  Users can preview cinema releases and download full feature films and music.

Coolroom has been highlighted as one of the few legal download services currently available in the UK. Coolroom enables users to download premium film and music content, and securely access it wirelessly within their home network with Intel Viiv enabled devices, as well as on Xbox 360.  Downloaded films and music can also be played on portable video and mp3 players.

3D Coolroom
Coolroom offers users a 3D virtual environment, styled around a loft apartment.  Different areas allow users to preview additional clips and cast interviews and upload personal content including music and pictures which can then be played and displayed in the apartment.  In the current version users can also personalise the apartment and there are suggestions it is moving towards social networking where users will be able to invite friends into their Coolroom.

Awards
Coolroom has been named in the "Britain's Digital Elite" awards sponsored by Real Business magazine and Microsoft.  The service was highly commended in the "Taking on the Big Guys" category.

References

Orton-Jones, Charles (12 November 2007). "Focus on Britain's Digital Elite" Real Business

External links
Official Website
Microsoft (Sep. 4 2007). Media Center Launches Immersive Entertainment for Film Buffs at the Touch of a Button. Press release.
Intel (Dec. 8 2006). Intel and Coolroom give Hollywood Blockbusters UK Broadband Premier. Press release.
Coolroom becomes the latest IPTV player Home Entertainment Week
Intel Viiv Technology Entertainment Showcase

British film websites
Online music stores of the United Kingdom
Virtual world communities